Out of the Shadow may refer to:

Out of the Shadow (Responsive), a self-released 2003 album by Rogue Wave
Out of the Shadow (album), a 2004 remastered version of the Rogue Wave album issued by Sub Pop Records
Out of the Shadow (1919 film), a 1919 American silent mystery film by Emil Chautard
Out of the Shadow (1961 film), a 1961 British thriller film by Michael Winner
Out of the Shadow (2004 film), an American documentary film by Susan Smiley about her mother's battle with schizophrenia
An alternative translation of the title of a novel Coming out of the Shadow by Janusz A. Zajdel

See also
Out of the Shadows (disambiguation)